I Heart Nick Carter is an American reality television series starring Nick Carter and his wife Lauren Kitt. The series premiered on September 10, 2014, on VH1.

Episodes

References

2010s American reality television series
2014 American television series debuts
2014 American television series endings
Television series based on singers and musicians
English-language television shows
VH1 original programming
Nick Carter (musician)